Archiminolia episcopalis is a species of sea snail, a marine gastropod mollusk in the family Solariellidae.

Description
The diameter of the shell attains 10.6 mm.

Distribution
This marine species is endemic to New Zealand and occurs off Three Kings Islands at a depth of 427 m.

References

 Marshall B.A. (1999). A revision of the Recent Solariellinae (Gastropoda: Trochoidea) of the New Zealand region. The Nautilus 113(1): 4-42

External links

episcopalis
Gastropods of New Zealand
Gastropods described in 1999